Three ships of the United States Navy have been named Conestoga after the Conestoga wagon, a broad wheeled, covered, wagon first built in Conestoga, Pennsylvania.

 , a side-wheeled steamer, was purchased in June 1861. She served on the Mississippi River and its tributaries during the American Civil War.
 USS Conestoga was the planned name for the monitor  and the name was changed while the ship was still on the stocks. She served in the American Civil War and later served in the Spanish–American War as Jason.
 , commissioned 10 November 1917, was lost at sea under unknown circumstances in 1921.  The fate of the vessel was a mystery until the wreck was identified in 2016.

References

Sources
 

United States Navy ship names